Binnya E Laung was heir-presumptive of Martaban from 1330 to the 1340s. The only known son of King Binnya E Law had a rival in his half-cousin Binnya U to be heir-apparent. He died of smallpox, and did not succeed his father as king.

Brief
Binnya E Laung was born to Prince Binnya E Law and a concubine in the 1320s. E Laung was probably born in Pegu (or less probably in Sittaung), the towns where his father was governor. He was a still a young child when his father brought him to the capital Martaban (Mottama). His father had been summoned by Queen Sanda Min Hla to take over the throne. But E Law did not bring E Laung's mother, a concubine, to Martaban.

As a result, E Laung grew up without his biological mother. He was raised by a nanny named Hnin An May Han. Although he was the only son of E Law, the prince was not officially appointed as heir-apparent. E Laung had a rival in his half-cousin Binnya U, son of Sanda Min Hla. The king was careful not to antagonize his chief queen, and never officially announced who his heir was. The ambiguity disturbed E Laung. One day, he organized an attack on U's camp. The two princes fought on elephant-back, and E Laung was defeated. The king finally chose sides, and arrested U. The king freed U only after intense protestations by queens Sanda Min Hla and Tala Shin Saw Bok, mother and aunt of U.

At any rate, E Laung died shortly after from smallpox.

Notes

References

Bibliography
 

Hanthawaddy dynasty
Deaths from smallpox
Non-inheriting heirs presumptive